Miss Ambar Regrets is a 2004 novel from Australian author Jon Cleary, the first new work he published since 1987 which was not a Scobie Malone novel.

The story revolves around a romance between an aspiring actress and a TV journalist. "I like writing about love and I like writing about women," he said of the book in a 2003 interview. "I've done it before, but I thought, goddammit, you've got to be franker now, writing about love, but you don't want to sound like an old man having his jollies."

References

External links
Miss Ambar Regrets at AustLit (subscription required)

2004 Australian novels
Australian romance novels
Contemporary romance novels
Novels about journalists
Novels about actors
HarperCollins books
Novels by Jon Cleary